Allan Douglas Matheson (3 May 1925 – 4 August 2008) was an Australian rules footballer who played for the Essendon Football Club in the Victorian Football League (VFL). He later played for Narraport and was captain-coach of Nullawil. Matheson worked as a caretaker and chaplain until his retirement in 1986.

Notes

External links 
		

Essendon Football Club past player profile

1925 births
2008 deaths
Australian rules footballers from Victoria (Australia)
Essendon Football Club players
Maryborough Football Club players